Annmari Viljanmaa (born July 10, 1973 in Huittinen) is a Finnish cross-country skier. She competed in three events at the 2002 Winter Olympics.

Cross-country skiing results
All results are sourced from the International Ski Federation (FIS).

Olympic Games

World Championships

World Cup

Season standings

Individual podiums
1 podium

Team podiums
1 victory – (1 ) 
1 podium – (1 )

References 

1973 births
Living people
Finnish female cross-country skiers
Olympic cross-country skiers of Finland
Cross-country skiers at the 2002 Winter Olympics
Sportspeople from Huittinen
21st-century Finnish women